Ancylodactylus alantika is a species of gecko. It is endemic to the Alantika Mountains and Hosséré Vokré plateau in Cameroon.

References

Endemic fauna of Cameroon
Ancylodactylus
Reptiles described in 2006
Fauna of the Cameroonian Highlands forests